was a Japanese illustrator and writer of children's books, known best for picture books with few or no words. He received the international Hans Christian Andersen Medal in 1984 for his "lasting contribution to children's literature."

Life

Anno was born in 1926 in Tsuwano, a small town in Shimane Prefecture, Japan and grew up there. As a student at a regional high school, he studied art, drawing, and the writings of Hermann Hesse.

During World War II, Anno was drafted into the Japanese army.  After the war, Anno earned a degree from the Yamaguchi Teacher Training College (a predecessor of Yamaguchi University) in 1948.  He taught mathematics for ten years in an elementary school in Tokyo before beginning a career illustrating children's books.

Anno lived in Japan with his wife, Midori. They had two children, Masaichiro and Seiko. He died on 24 December 2020 from cirrhosis of the liver.

Art

Anno was best known for wordless picture books featuring small, detailed figures.  In the "Journey" books, a tiny character travels through a nation's landscape, densely populated with pictures referencing that country's art, literature, culture, and history.  Anno's illustrations are often in pen and ink and watercolor, and occasionally incorporate collage and woodcuts.  They are intricately detailed, showing a sense of humor as well as an interest in science, mathematics, and foreign cultures.  They frequently incorporate subtle jokes and references.  Anno's style has been compared to that of M. C. Escher.

Although he was best known for his children's books, his paintings have earned recognition in his native Japan. In Tsuwano the Mitsumasa Anno Museum houses a collection of his works.

Awards

The biennial Hans Christian Andersen Award conferred by the International Board on Books for Young People is the highest recognition available to a writer or illustrator of children's books. Anno received the illustration award in 1984.

Chicago Tribune Honor Award (1970)
The Minister of Education's Art Encouragement Prize for New Artists (1974)
 Kate Greenaway Medal, commended runner-up (1974), Anno's Alphabet
Brooklyn Museum of Art Award (1975)
 Boston Globe–Horn Book Award, Picture Book (1975), Anno's Alphabet
 BG–HB Honor, Picture Book (1977), Anno's Counting Book
 Boston Globe–Horn Book Award, Picture Book (1978), Anno's Journey
BIB Golden Apple Award (1979)
Graphic Award, Bologna Children's Book Fair (1980)
Person of Cultural Merit (2012)

Selected works

 Mysterious Pictures (1968)
 Jeux de construction (1970)
 Topsy Turvies (1970)
 Upside Downers (1971)
 Zwergenspuk (1972)
 Dr. Anno's Magical Midnight Circus (1972)
 Anno's Alphabet (1974)
 Anno's Counting Book (1975)
 Anno's Journey (1977)
 Anno's Animals (1979)
 Anno's Italy (1979)
 The Unique World of Mitsumasa Anno: Selected Works, 1968-1977 (London: Bodley Head, New York: Philomel, 1980)
 Anno's Magical ABC (1981)
 Anno's Counting House (1982)
 Anno's Britain (1982)
 Anno's USA (1983)
 Anno's Flea Market (1984)
 Anno's Three Little Pigs (1985)
 The King's Flower (1986)
 All in a Day (1986)
 Anno's Sundial (1987)
 Anno's Upside Downers (1988)
 In Shadowland (1988)
 Anno's Peekaboo (1988)
 Anno's Faces (1989)
 Anno's Aesop: A Book of Fables (1989)
 Chyi Miaw Gwo (1990)
 Anno's Medieval World (1990)
 Anno's Masks (1990)
 The Animals (1992)
 Anno's Hat Tricks (1993)
 Anno's Twice Told Tale (1993)
 Anno's Magic Seeds (1995)
 Anno's Journey (1997)
 Anno's Math Games (1997)
 Anno's Math Games 2 (1997)
 Anno's Math Games 3 (1997)
 Anno's Mysterious Multiplying Jar (1999)
 The Art Of Mitsumasa Anno: Bridging Cultures (with Ann Beneduce) (2003)
 Bungotai for Youths (2003)
 Anno's Spain (2004)

As illustrator only
 Socrates and the Three Little Pigs, by Tsuyoshi Mori (1986)
 The Magic Pocket: Selected Poems, poems by Michio Mado (1998)

See also

Notes

References

External links
 

1926 births
2020 deaths
Hans Christian Andersen Award for Illustration winners
Japanese children's book illustrators
Japanese children's writers
Artists from Shimane Prefecture